These are the squads for the 1998 CONCACAF Gold Cup.

Group A

Brazil
Head coach:  Mário Zagallo

El Salvador
Head coach:  Kiril Dojcinovski

Guatemala
Head coach:  Miguel Ángel Brindisi

Jamaica
Head coach:  René Simoes

Group B

Honduras
Head coach:  Miguel Company

Mexico
Head coach:  Manuel Lapuente

Trinidad and Tobago
Head coach:  Bertille St. Clair

Group C

Costa Rica
Head coach:  Rolando Villalobos

Cuba
Head coach:  William Bennett

United States
Head coach:  Steve Sampson

References

External links
 Matches and squads

CONCACAF Gold Cup squads
Squads